Dato' Dr. Mansor bin Othman (Jawi: منصور بن عثمان) is a Malaysian politician who served as the Deputy Minister of Environment and Water in the Barisan Nasional (BN) administration under former Prime Minister Ismail Sabri Yaakob and former Minister Tuan Ibrahim from August 2021 to the collapse of the BN administration in November 2022, Deputy Minister of Higher Education in the Perikatan Nasional (PN) administration under former Prime Minister Muhyiddin Yassin and former Minister Noraini Ahmad from March 2020 to the collapse of the PN administration in August 2021, Member of Parliament (MP) for Nibong Tebal from May 2013 to November 2022, Deputy Chief Minister I of Penang, Member of the Penang State Executive Council (EXCO), Member of the Penang State Legislative Assembly (MLA) for Penanti from June 2009 to May 2018 as well as Chairman of the Defence and Home Affairs Select Committee from December 2018 to December 2019. He is a member of the Malaysian United Indigenous Party (BERSATU), a component party of the PN coalition and was a member of the People's Justice Party (PKR), a component party of the Pakatan Harapan (PH) coalition.

Political career 
He was also chairman of PKR Penang liaison committee. He served Anwar Ibrahim as political secretary after leaving his service as senior lecturer at University of Science Malaysia. He was re-elected in the 2018 Malaysian general election.

Health issue 
On 21 October 2019, Othman collapsed while debating the 2020 Malaysian federal budget, later revealed to be the result of suffering from a reflex syncope. He was caught by Subang MP Wong Chen and Ledang MP Syed Ibrahim Syed Noh before being attended to by Bandar Kuching MP Kelvin Yii Lee Wuen, who is also a doctor, and later discharged from hospital after his condition stabilised.

Election results

Honours 
  :
  Companion of the Order of the Defender of State (DMPN) – Dato' (2010)

See also 
 Defence and Home Affairs Select Committee
 2009 Penanti by-election
 Nibong Tebal (federal constituency)
 Penanti (state constituency)

References 

Living people
1951 births
Date of birth missing (living people)
Place of birth missing (living people)
Malaysian people of Malay descent
Malaysian Muslims
Members of the Dewan Rakyat
Former People's Justice Party (Malaysia) politicians
Malaysian United Indigenous Party politicians
Members of the Penang State Legislative Assembly
Penang state executive councillors
21st-century Malaysian politicians